The Brisbane Handball Club is a handball club based in the eastern suburbs of Brisbane, Australia.

The club is affiliated with Handball Queensland, plays in the Brisbane Handball League, and hosts a league for juniors (children aged 8-15).

The club offers handball programs for children and adults across all skill levels. Membership is available for a school term (10 weeks), half a year, full year. The club operates year-round. The senior club is located at Nissan Arena and the junior club is located at Balmoral State High School.

See also

 Queensland Handball League
 Australian Handball Club Championship

References

External links
 

Sporting clubs in Brisbane
Australian handball clubs